Laura Brown may refer to:

 Laura Brown (fashion journalist) (born 1974), Australian fashion journalist
 Laura Brown (cyclist) (born 1986), Canadian cyclist
 Laura Brown (chemist), American chemist
 Laura Brown (golfer) (born 1970), American golfer
 Laura A. Brown (1874–1924), American activist and local politician in Pennsylvania